Noah Maposa (born 3 June 1985, in Kopong) is a Botswana footballer, who currently plays for Township Rollers.

Career
He played one game for Bay United in the National First Division.

On 29 January 2015, Noah join Township Rollers

References 

1985 births
Living people
Botswana footballers
Botswana international footballers
Botswana expatriate footballers
Expatriate soccer players in South Africa
Botswana expatriate sportspeople in South Africa
Expatriate footballers in Tunisia
Mochudi Centre Chiefs SC players
Gaborone United S.C. players
2012 Africa Cup of Nations players
Bay United F.C. players
AS Gabès players
Association football goalkeepers